Beroa may refer to:

 an old spelling of Veria in Greece
 a historical name for Aleppo, Syria